Epichloë sinofestucae is a hybrid asexual species in the fungal genus Epichloë. 

A systemic and seed-transmissible grass symbiont first described in 2009,  Epichloë sinofestucae is a natural allopolyploid of Epichloë bromicola and a strain in the Epichloë typhina complex.

Epichloë sinofestucae is found in Asia, where it has been identified in the grass species Festuca parvigluma.

References

sinofestucae
Fungi described in 2009
Fungi of Asia